Small Business Act may refer to:
 The Small Business Act (United States), which created the Small Business Administration
 The Small Business Act for Europe